Khoveyseh (also known as Ḩofeyreh, Ḩofeyrī, Ḩofīrī, ‘Ufaireh, and Yofereh) is a village in Qaleh Chenan Rural District, in the Central District of Karun County, Khuzestan Province, Iran. At the 2006 census, its population was 221, in 33 families.

References 

Populated places in Karun County